Anisur Rahman Milon is a Bangladeshi actor. He is a co-president of the Actors Equity.

Career
Milon began his acting career at age 12 with Artonad Theater. Then he acted in TV series "Ronger Manush", directed by Salauddin Lavlu. Tele-film "Doyeeta" "Projapotikal" "Hatkura" "Modhumoira" "Atappor" was great for his career and then appeared in high-profile film "The Last Thakur". Milon also played a lead role in the 2007 NTV series 111: A Nelson Number.

On 28 January 2022, Milon became a co-president of the Actors Equity after receiving 398 votes.

Filmography

Television

Awards
 Uro CJFB Performance Award (2005)
 RTV CJFB Performance Award (2006)
 Meril Protham Alo Award for Best TV Actor (2006)
 RTV Star Award - Best Actor - Drama "Alashpur" (2017)

References

External links
 

Living people
Bangladeshi male film actors
Bangladeshi male television actors
Year of birth missing (living people)